Abdou Pasha is a station on Cairo Metro, part of phase 1 of Line 3. it is located in Abdou Pasha Square.

History
Abdou Pasha Station was inaugurated on 21 February 2012 as part of phase 1 of Line 3.

Overview

In addition, the station have a contactless fare collection system as well as an integrated supervision and communication system supplied by the Thales Group.

Station layout

Notable places nearby
 Faculty of Engineering Ain Shams University
 Industrial area behind the Faculty of Engineering
 Different schools

See also
 Cairo Metro
 Cairo Metro Line 3
 List of Cairo Metro stations

References

Cairo metro stations
2012 establishments in Egypt
Railway stations opened in 2012